Fortress Mountain is located in the Absaroka Range in the U.S. state of Wyoming. The headwaters of Cabin Creek are on the east slopes of Fortress Mountain, while those for Sheep Creek are on the northwest.

References

Mountains of Wyoming
Mountains of Park County, Wyoming
Shoshone National Forest